Hon. John Ponsonby, PC (Ire) (29 March 171316 August 1787) was an Anglo-Irish politician.

Biography
Ponsonby was the second son of Brabazon Ponsonby, who was created the Earl of Bessborough in 1739, and his first wife,  Sarah Margetson Colvill. He was the grandson of William Ponsonby, 1st Viscount Duncannon.

In 1739, Ponsonby entered the Irish House of Commons for Newtownards, becoming its speaker in 1756. He also served as First Commissioner of the Revenue and he became a member of the Privy Council of Ireland in 1746. In 1761, Ponsonby was elected for Kilkenny County and Armagh Borough, and sat for the first. In 1768, he stood also for Gowran and Newtownards, and in 1776 for Carlow Borough, but chose each time Kilkenny County, which he represented until 1783. Subsequently, Ponsonby was again returned for Newtownards and sat for this constituency until his death in 1787.

Belonging to one of the great families which at this time monopolized the government of Ireland, Ponsonby was one of the principal "undertakers," men who controlled the whole of the king's business in Ireland, and he retained the chief authority until George Townshend, 1st Marquess Townshend became lord-lieutenant in 1767. Then followed a struggle for supremacy between the Ponsonby faction and the party dependent on Townshend, one result of this being that Ponsonby resigned the speakership in 1771.

He married in 1743 Lady Elizabeth Cavendish, daughter of the 3rd Duke of Devonshire, a connection which was of great importance to the Ponsonbys. (His older brother, William Ponsonby, 2nd Earl of Bessborough, had married the Duke's eldest daughter in 1739.) His sons, William Ponsonby, 1st Baron Ponsonby of Imokilly, and George Ponsonby, were also politicians of distinction. His daughter Catherine married Richard Boyle, 2nd Earl of Shannon, and was mother to Henry Boyle, 3rd Earl of Shannon.

References 

1713 births
1789 deaths
Irish MPs 1727–1760
Irish MPs 1761–1768
Irish MPs 1769–1776
Irish MPs 1776–1783
Irish MPs 1783–1790
Cavendish family
Members of the Privy Council of Ireland
John Ponsonby (politician)
Speakers of the Parliament of Ireland (pre-1801)
Younger sons of earls
Members of the Parliament of Ireland (pre-1801) for County Donegal constituencies
Members of the Parliament of Ireland (pre-1801) for County Kilkenny constituencies
Members of the Parliament of Ireland (pre-1801) for County Armagh constituencies
Members of the Parliament of Ireland (pre-1801) for County Carlow constituencies